Shelton Ditch is an artificial canal in Marion County, Oregon, United States. Built in the mid-19th century, it originates from Mill Creek east of Airport Road in Salem, passes through a corner of the Salem main Post Office property, and along the southern edge of downtown Salem. Shelton Ditch passes by the north side of Pringle Park before emptying into Pringle Creek. After the Mill Race joins Pringle Creek near Salem's city hall, Pringle Creek passes under the Boise Cascade building and empties into the Willamette River next to Riverfront Park across from Minto-Brown Island Park.

Shelton Ditch passes along the edge of Salem Hospital's property. This has been a problem in the past as Shelton Ditch is prone to flooding, necessitating evacuation of the hospital's patients, including during the Christmas flood of 1964.

See also
 List of canals in Oregon

References

External links
"Campus and Community Monitoring and Restoration of Mill Creek/Shelton Ditch" grant information from USGS State Water Resources Research Institute Program
Historic images of Shelton Ditch from Salem Public Library

Canals in Oregon
Geography of Salem, Oregon
Willamette River
Geography of Marion County, Oregon